Rio Nido is an American jazz vocal group.

Rio Nido may also refer to:

 Rio Nido, California, a small unincorporated resort community on the Russian River in Sonoma County, California, U.S.
 Esteban Río Nido, a pseudonym of Stephen Sondheim when he wrote The Boy From...